Joan "Nani" Roma Cararach (born 17 February 1972) is a rally racing driver from Folgueroles, Barcelona, Spain. He won the Dakar Rally riding a motorcycle in 2004. Since then he has entered in the car category, taking the win in the 2014 edition of the race. From 2021 he has been part of the BRX Prodrive Hunter team for whom he will again drive for in 2022.

Honours

Dakar results

Notes

External links
 

1972 births
Living people
Catalan rally drivers
Motorcycle racers from Catalonia
Spanish motorcycle racers
Enduro riders
Off-road racing drivers
Dakar Rally drivers
Dakar Rally motorcyclists
Dakar Rally winning drivers
Off-road motorcycle racers